Archiv Produktion is a classical music record label of German origin. It originated in 1949 as a classical label for the Deutsche Grammophon Gesellschaft (DGG), and in 1958 Archiv was established as a subsidiary of DGG, specialising in recordings of Early and Baroque music. It has since developed a particular focus on "historically informed performance" and the work of artists of the Early music revival movement of the 20th and 21st centuries.

The first head of Archiv Produktion, serving in the position from 1948 to 1957, was Fred Hamel, a musicologist who set out the early Archiv Produktion releases according to 12 research periods, from Gregorian Chant to Mannheim and Vienna. Hamel's successor 1958-1968 Hans Hickmann was a professor at the University of Hamburg who focused on Bach and Handel. The next director was Andreas Holschneider (1931–2019) from 1970-1991. In December 1991 Holschneider gave an interview to Gramophone where he defended the entry of Archiv Produktion and "authentic instrument" specialists such as John Eliot Gardiner into Romantic territory of Schumann and Berlioz. The label's next head was Peter Czornyj (b. 1956) from 1992.<ref>Martin Elste Meilensteine der Bach-Interpretation 1750 - 2000</ref>

In parallel, the Decca Records also acquired the rights to the recording catalogue of the French-Australian music publishers Éditions de l'Oiseau-Lyre in 1970 and began to issue early music recordings using the l'Oiseau-Lyre brand.

Key artists and recordings
1940s
 Archiv Produktion's first recording was of Helmut Walcha playing Bach, 1947, released in 1948. Walcha went on to make two complete series of Bach's organ output (excepting a few minor pieces), one in mono recorded in 1947-52, one in stereo in the late 1960s and early 1970s. Both sets were released by Archiv to wide acclaim and have later been reissued on cd.
 Fine Krakamp making solo harpsichord recordings in 1948 of Buxtehude & Krieger.

1950s
 Ralph Kirkpatrick (harpsichord, many recordings of Bach and Handel)
 Schola Cantorum Basiliensis under August Wenzinger

1960s
 Cappella Coloniensis
 Berlin Hugo Distler Chor, Klaus Fischer-Dieskau
 Josef Ulsamer 
 Münchener Bach-Chor & Münchener Bach-Orchester, Karl Richter 
 Colin Tilney, Jörg Demus, Dietrich Fischer-Dieskau
 Schola Cantorum "Francesco Coradini" - Fosco Corti
 Pierre Fournier (cello and viola da gamba)

1970s
 Monteverdi-Chor Hamburg, Jürgen Jürgens
 Pro Cantione Antiqua (medieval/renaissance vocal music, including a long series of albums of 15th/16th century polyphony)
 Charles Mackerras
 Camerata Bern, Heinz Holliger

1980s
 Musica Antiqua Köln, Reinhard Goebel
 The English Concert, Trevor Pinnock.
 Monteverdi Choir and Orchestra, John Eliot Gardiner
 harpsichordist Kenneth Gilbert

1990s
 Musiciens du Louvre, Marc Minkowski - first recording for Archiv was Rameau's Hippolyte et Aricie'' 1994.
 Orlando Consort
 Pomerium (ensemble)
 Piffaro, The Renaissance Band

2000s
 Gabrieli Consort & Players, Paul McCreesh
 Il Complesso Barocco, Alan Curtis

2010s
 Venice Baroque Orchestra, Andrea Marcon, Giuliano Carmignola
 Pablo Heras-Casado
 Mahan Esfahani

References

External links
 Official Archiv Produktion Website
 History of the Archiv Label

Classical music record labels
Early music record labels
German record labels
Labels distributed by Universal Music Group
Record labels established in 1949
1949 establishments in Germany